Iranian Revolution conspiracy theory may refer to:
Jimmy Carter's engagement with Khomeini
British–Ruhollah Khomeini conspiracy theory